John M. Rodgers (March 3, 1928 – September 29, 2012) was a Democratic member of the Pennsylvania House of Representatives.
 He was born in Bristol. He died at his home in 2012.

References

Democratic Party members of the Pennsylvania House of Representatives
2012 deaths
1928 births